Ihor Della-Rossa (born 25 April 1939) is a Ukrainian racewalker. He competed in the men's 50 kilometres walk at the 1968 Summer Olympics, representing the Soviet Union.

References

1939 births
Living people
Athletes (track and field) at the 1968 Summer Olympics
Ukrainian male racewalkers
Olympic athletes of the Soviet Union
Place of birth missing (living people)
Soviet male racewalkers